The Absa L'Atelier Art Competition is a South African annual art award for South African visual artists between the ages of 21 and 35. The competition is run in conjunction with the South African National Association for the Visual Arts (SANAVA).

History

The art award was originally known as the Volkskas Bank Atelier Competition and was established in 1986 and kept this name up to 1998 (when Volkskas was incorporated into the Absa Group). 
From 1999 to 2001 the award was known as the Absa Atelier competition.

From 2004 the Gerard Sekoto award was added to the competition, to support the most promising artist taking part in the competition with an income of less than R60 000 per annum. 
This award is supported by the French Embassy, the French Institute and Alliance Française.

In the early 1980s SANAVA acquired three atelier apartments at the Cité internationale des arts from where the name Atelier Competition has its origin.  These assets are held in trust in terms of an Occupational Rights Agreement by the SANAVA Cité des Arts Trust, valid until 22 March 2060.

Previous winners and merit awards

1986

Winner
Penny Siopis

Merit Award Winners
Deborah Bell,
Andrew Breebaart,
Dennis Purvis and
Simon Stone

1987

Winner
Clive van den Berg

Merit Award Winners
Andries Botha,
Philippa Hobbs,
Tommy Motswai and
Karel Nel

1988

Winner
Diane Victor

Merit Award Winners
Kay Cowley,
Guy du Toit,
Johann Louw and
Margaret Vorster

1989

Winner
Hennie Stroebel

Merit Award Winners
Caroline Jones,
Walter Oltman,
Giulio Tambellini and
Jeremy Wafer

1990

Winner
Barend de Wet

Merit Award Winners
Andrew Breebaart,
Jean Bruwer,
Guy du Toit and
Judy Woodborne

1991

Winner
Virginia McKenny

Merit Award Winners
Nicole Donald,
Ruth Mileham,
Johann van der Schijff and
Pierre van der Westhuizen

1992

Winner
Paul Edmunds

Merit Award Winners
Wayne Barker,
Marc Edwards,
Dominic Thorburn and
Minette Vári

1993

Winner
Dominic Thorburn

Merit Award Winners
Siemon Allen,
Diek Grobler,
Adam Letch and
Russel Scott

1994

Winner
Jonathan Comerford

Merit Award Winners
Andrew Putter,
Kevin Roberts,
Henk Serfontein and
Alastair Whitton

1995

Winner
Kevin Roberts

Merit Award Winners
Moses Ceywayo,
Gordon Froud,
Diek Grobler and
Peet Pienaar

1996

Winner
Isaac Khanyile

Merit Award Winners
Hanneke Benadé,
Wim Botha,
Semkelo Bunu and
Berco Wilsenach

1997

Winner
Ilse Pahl

Merit Award Winners
Lucas Bambo,
Cecile Heystek,
Kim Lieberman and
Richardt Strydom

1998

Winner
Karl Gietl

Merit Award Winners
Wayne Barker,
Hanneke Benadé,
Jean Brundit and
Peter Rippon

1999

Winner
Ryan Arenson

Merit Award Winners
Brad Hammond,
Fritha Langerman,
Albert Redelinghuys and
Vanessa van Wyk

2000

Winner
Brad Hammond

Merit Award Winners
Joni Brenner
Natasha Christopher,
Colbert Mashile and
Nigel Mullins

2001

Winner
Stefanus Rademeyer

Merit Award Winners
Marco Cianfanelli,
Daniel Hirschman,
Brent Meistre and
Merryn Singer

2002

Winner
Marco Cianfanelli

Merit Award Winners
Natasha Christopher,
Alastair McLachlan,
Benninghoff Puren and
James Webb

2003

Winner
Sanell Aggenbach

Merit Award Winners
Retha Bornmann,
Natasha Christopher,
Patricia Driscoll and
Berco Wilsenach

2004

Winner
Conrad Botes

Merit Award Winners
Stephen Hobbs
Pieter Hugo,
Lize Muller and
Robert Rich

Gerard Sekoto Award Winners
Billie Zangewa

2005

Winner
Berco Wilsenach

Merit Award Winners
Katherine Bull,
Lawrence Lemoaona,
Patrice Mabasa and
Mikhael Subotzky

Gerard Sekoto Winner
Lawrence Lemoaona

2006

Winner
Ruth Sachs

Merit Award Winners
Nathani Lüneburg,
Riason Naidoo,
Anet Norval and
James Webb

Gerard Sekoto Winner
Nomusa Makhubu

2007

Winner
Pierre Fouché

Merit Award Winners
Nina Barnett,
Wayne Matthews,
Lyndi Sales and
Jaco Spies

Gerard Sekoto Winner
Nina Barnett

2008

Winner
James Webb

Merit Award Winners
Christiaan Hattingh,
Lunga Kama,
Alhyrian Laue and
Antonia Steyn

Gerard Sekoto Winner
Retha Ferguson

2009

Winner
Stephen Rosin

2010

Winner
Ilka van Schalkwyk

Merit Award Winners
Abri de Swardt,
Philiswa Lila,
Collen Maswanganyi and
Hanje Whitehead.

Gerard Sekoto Winner
Bongumenzi Ngobese

2012

Winner
Elrie Joubert

Merit Award Winners
Sibiya Bambo,
Mandy Johnston,
Heidi Janice Mielke and
Nina Liebenberg

Gerard Sekoto Winner
Sibiya Bambo

2013

Winner
Pauline Gutter

Merit Award Winners
Kathleen Sawyer and
Jaco Van Schalkwyk

Gerard Sekoto Winner
Mongezi Ncaphayi

2014

Winner
Liberty Battson

Merit Award Winners
Bevan de Wet and
Luyanda Zindela

Gerard Sekoto Winner
Mbavhalelo Nekhavhambe

2015

Winner
Kai Losgott

Merit Award Winners
Gideon Appah (non South African prize from Ghana),
Nina Kruger and
Nelmarie du Preez

Gerard Sekoto Winner
Natalie Moore

References

External links
"L'Atelier Competition"

Contemporary art awards
Early career awards
South African art awards